Schaffner is a surname, and may refer to:

 Dwite H. Schaffner (1889–1955), American Medal of Honor recipient
 Franklin J. Schaffner (1920–1989), American film director
 Hans Schaffner (1908–2004), Swiss liberal politician
 Jakob Schaffner (1875–1944), Swiss novelist
 John Henry Schaffner (1866–1939), American botanist
 Kenneth F. Schaffner (born 1939), American philosopher
 Nicholas Schaffner (1953–1991), American writer on popular music
 William Schaffner (1941–1970), United States Air Force pilot

See also
 Schaffer
 American clothiers Hart Schaffner & Marx, now known as Hartmarx